EVO or Evo may refer to:

Companies 
 Evo (company), American sporting goods and outdoor recreation retailer

Games
 Evolution Championship Series, an annual fighting game esports tournament in the US
 Evo (board game), a 2001 board game
 E.V.O.: Search for Eden, a video game released for the Super NES in 1992

People
 Bill Evo (born 1954), an American ice hockey player
 Evo Anton DeConcini (1901–1986), American jurist
 Evo Morales (born 1959), President of Bolivia from 2006–2019

Places
 Evo, a village in Hämeenlinna, Finland

Publications
 East Village Other, a 1965–1972 American underground newspaper in New York City
 EVO (comics), a 2002 comic crossover between Top Cow/Image Comics titles
 Evo (magazine), a British car magazine

Technology
 Compaq Evo, a series of personal computers
 Enhanced VOB, a container digital video format
 EVO Smart Console, a PC and game console
 HTC Evo 4G, a smartphone
EVO (release group), a movie release group

Transportation
 Evo Car Share, a carsharing service in the Greater Vancouver area
 Evo tube train, a train type being developed by London Underground in New Tube for London
 Lancer Evolution, a car manufactured by Mitsubishi
 several models of Lamborghini Huracan

Characters
 a character from the animated series Monsuno
 a comic book character in the WildStorm franchise
 a character from Lego Hero Factory

Other uses
 Evo (guitar), the name of Steve Vai's primary instrument
 Evo (restaurant), a Michelin-starred restaurant in Barcelona, Spain
 EVO Banco, a Spanish bank
 a train in the London Underground rolling stock
 Exponentially Variegated Organism, fictional mutants in the Generator Rex series
Extra-virgin olive oil

See also
 Evolution (disambiguation)
 Ivo, a masculine given name